Étables-sur-Mer (literally Étables on Sea; ; Gallo: Establ) is a former commune in the Côtes-d'Armor department of Brittany in northwestern France. It is the seat of the commune of Binic-Étables-sur-Mer.

History 
It is notable as the birthplace of Saint Théodore Guérin (Saint Theodora).

On 1 March 2016, Binic and Étables-sur-Mer merged becoming one commune called Binic-Étables-sur-Mer.

Population 

Inhabitants of Étables-sur-Mer are called tagarins or établais in French.

See also
 Communes of the Côtes-d'Armor department

References

External links

 

Seaside resorts in France
Former communes of Côtes-d'Armor